Mundair Kalan, commonly known as Mundair Sharif Syedan (Urdu:  is a village situated near Sahowala, between Ugoki and Sambrial in the Sialkot District of the Punjab province of Pakistan. It is situated between two canals.

Villages in Sialkot District